A Television-lift, TV-lift for short, or also TV lifting system, is an electrically powered mechanical system which lifts or moves televisions vertically or horizontally out of furniture, ceilings or partition walls. The main reason for using a TV lift system is in order to integrate a television into the existing interior design of a room without the television disrupting the overall design appearance. Due to the high overall project costs associated with TV lifts, they are regarded as a luxury product and are as a consequence most commonly to be found in more up-scale homes and apartments, conference rooms, private jets or yachts.

History 

The first TV lifts were launched on the market in the USA at the beginning of the 1950s. As a consequence of the fact that the cathode-ray televisions of the time were usually heavy and bulky, the first TV lifts were also very large and bulky constructions which required quite a large amount of space for their installation. At the beginning, there were primarily TV lifts which lifted the cathode-ray television upwards out of a piece of furniture or a room divider. The vertical ceiling lifts first came onto the scene in the mid-1970s as a result of the television manufacturing industry by that time having developed cathode-ray televisions which were flatter and lighter. At the beginning of the new millennium in the year 2000, plasma display televisions were introduced which meant that more compact systems (Flatlift devices) became available on the market. After the lighter LED televisions replaced the plasma screen technology in 2011, the technology could be refined even further.

Designs and Types of TV Lift Devices 

The following named systems usually have in common that the television is mounted on or in it using the Vesa Mounting Interface Standard. For deviating standards, there are adapters available. Furthermore, a combination of the following devices with different cover flap solutions is possible in the vast majority of cases.

Pop-Up 

There are many different types of TV lift systems. The most frequent type of system used when the television is to be lifted vertically consists of a multipiece telescopic pipe which is driven by the interior spindle and electric motor. When the electric motor is activated, the multipiece telescopic pipe extends and moves upward. As a result of being extended, the individual pipes change the position of the TV. The pipe is positioned in an upright and central position in the vast majority of cases and is fitted with a standing foot which ensures that the object installed is stable and secure.

Depending on the particular manufacturer, there is also a U-design for vertical TV lift applications. In the case of this U-design, a platform moves the TV upward out of the piece of furniture by means of a tubular motor. Nowadays, the U-design TV lift is regarded as outdated.

Pop-Down 

In the case of the reversely functioning and vertically sinkable TV ceiling lift system, the design looks similar to that of the vertical TV lifting system, with one important difference: due to the fact that the load is pulled, motors and components which have been approved for pull loads should be used. These are far more expensive compared to the components used for the push application, as these are required to assume extensive retention forces.

The cover lid solution is realised in a congruent fashion to the pop-up TV lift systems, merely in reverse.

Lift System with Articulating Monitor Arm 

TV lifts which can be extended sideways are predominantly mounted to furniture cabinets or partition walls. Utilising one or several rails and drives, it is possible to have the TV extend out sideways from the particular piece of furniture or the wall. A number of manufacturers also manufacture specially designed articulating monitor arms which include a component which can be swivelled when the arm is extended. This means that the TV can be extended out sideways from the cabinet and then swivelled in any arbitrary direction in the room, meaning that the seats can be arranged in any direction or at any angle to the television.

Monitor Lift System 

The design of a monitor lift system is for the most part similar to that of the vertical pop-up TV lift system, with the only real difference being that the movement radius of the motor and the electrics are enclosed inside a sheet metal module. The system is conceived for smaller PC monitor sizes. They are predominantly installed in conference room tables in order to save space. The monitor lift systems are inserted from above into the section which has been cut out of the table by a carpenter or joiner and they are then secured to the table once again from below with screws. The upper part of the monitor lift system is often a cover plate made of brushed steel. With the push of a button, the cover section folds inward into the monitor lift and makes way for the monitor to move into position. The monitor moves up automatically and can still be tilted electronically when in the end position. A number of manufacturers manufacture the monitor lift with a fixed display. Monitor lift systems are available in various sizes ranging from 15 inches up to 42 inches.

Wall Panel Lift System 

In an automatically changing wall panel, there is the widest variety of designs available. Certain designs employ guide rails and cable hoists, while other systems make use of grooves and belts. Despite the wide variety of designs, all the systems basically achieve the same result. A TV waits behind a wall panel, flush to the actual wall. With the push of a button, the wall panel moves inward and is then automatically raised or sunk – depending on where it is installed – in order to make way for the TV. The TV is then moved forward and takes the place of the wall panel until it is flush with the actual wall. In the case of some special designs, the TV can also turned and swivelled in various different directions.

Picture Lift System 

The picture lift system is usually made from an aluminium frame. It covers a television which is installed in a niche in the wall. There are picture lift systems in different sizes for differently sized pictures. In the case of the most professionally produced picture lift systems, the rear picture frame of a picture can be braced, clamped or screwed to the aluminium frame. With a single push of a button on the remote control, the picture lift moves the picture either upward or downward and the television can then be watched. A number of manufacturers also manufacture special designs which combine picture lift with the additional TV swivel option.

TV Swivel System 

The TV swivel system is simply screwed to the wall, a cabinet or a piece of furniture just like any conventional flat-screen wall bracket. Depending on the direction in which it is mounted, the TV swivel system can be swivelled outward either to the left or right. This makes it possible to watch television from a variety of different viewing positions and angles. TV swivel systems can be specially designed and combined with further devices in order to achieve invisible TV installation. A number of manufacturers also offer the possibility to programme the viewing angle down to the exact degree angle.

Projector lift 

Apart from the TV lift systems, there are also the related projector lift systems. These projector lift systems may be distinguished into two equipment groups. On the one hand there is the projector ceiling light, which vertically lowers the projector downwards from a suspended ceiling, and there are projector lifts for integration into tables or furniture. The latter moves the projector vertically upwards, out of the furniture or table. Both systems are mostly made from ultra light aluminium. Stable equipment guiding is achieved in most cases using scissors or special guides. A projector lift system is often driven by a tubular motor, or another electromotor, which moves a shaft accordingly. Then the lower platform which the projector stands on, can be lowered via special belts or chains. Projector ceiling lift systems are available as ultra flat versions right up to stage projector lift devices with a lift of 5m and more, and a load bearing capacity of several 100 kg.

Flap opening solutions 

If the TV lift is integrated into a piece of furniture, wall or ceiling, there are a number of different cover lid solutions which are possible:

 cover lid which is pushed open by the TV lift;
 floating cover lid, which moves upward with the TV;
 a case which encloses the TV or a TV housing also moves upward completely;
 automatic solution, the cover lid is pushed open and folds out or into the interior of the piece of furniture.

Due to the additional costs of the electric cover lid, the automatic solution is primarily used only in yachts, because this particular cover lid must always be used due to the pitching and swaying movements of the yacht. There are, however, also projects on land for which the electric cover lid is used on exclusively aesthetic grounds.

Safety Measures 

Certain TV lift systems can be equipped with a contact strip or a programmable anti-collision monitoring system. The latter is absolutely necessary in the case of autonomously operating systems. If the TV lift has a dead man's switch, then the TV lift system stops as soon as the operator releases the button on the radio receiver. In the case of the anti-collision monitoring system, the power supply is measured. If the amount of power increases rapidly to a peak, the control box stops and lets the TV lift move in the opposite direction in order to dislodge the obstacle.

References
1.DE Patent for TV-Ceiling lift. Inventor Mr. Sascha Rissel, Worms,Germany
2.DE Patent for TV-Pop-Up and Pop-Down Lift. Inventor Mr. Sascha Rissel, Worms, Germany
3.US Patent for Pop-Up TV-lift, Furniture Integration - Inventor Thomas Hazzard
4.DE Patent for Positioning of a Flatscreen TV. Inventor Mr. Sascha Rissel, Worms, Germany

Television technology